Rupert Frederick George Byron, 11th Baron Byron (13 August 1903 – 1 November 1983) was a British nobleman, peer, politician, and the eleventh Baron Byron, as a descendant of a cousin of Romantic poet and writer, George Gordon Byron, 6th Baron Byron.

Life
Byron was the elder son of Col. Wilfrid Byron, of Perth, Western Australia, and of Sylvia Mary Byron née Moore, of Winchester, England, the only daughter of the Reverend C. T. Moore. He was educated at Gresham's School, Holt.

A farmer and grazier in Australia from 1921, he served in the Second World War as a Lieutenant of the RANVR, from 1941 to 1946, and succeeded his first cousin once removed, the Rev. Frederick Ernest Charles Byron, 10th Baron Byron, to the peerage in 1949. He belonged to naval and military clubs in Perth, Western Australia.

Lord Byron died on 1 November 1983 in Mount Claremont, Western Australia, and was succeeded by his fifth cousin, Lt. Col. Richard Geoffrey Gordon Byron, 12th Baron Byron DSO (born 1899).

Family
He married Pauline Augusta Cornwall (d.1993), daughter of T. J. Cornwall of Wagin, Western Australia, in 1931, and they had one daughter, the Hon. Isobel Ann Byron (1932).

Arms

References
BYRON, Rupert Frederick George Byron in Who Was Who 1897–2006 online, from Byron, Rupert Frederick George Byron (accessed 22 August 2007)

1903 births
1983 deaths
20th-century Australian people
People educated at Gresham's School
Rupert
Australian farmers
Royal Australian Navy personnel of World War II
Barons Byron